Minzhong is a town in situated at the northeastern periphery of the city of Zhongshan, in the Pearl River Delta region of Guangdong province. The population of Minzhong has  residents.

See also
Shatian dialect

External links
Minzhong Government Website

Zhongshan
Township-level divisions of Guangdong